"Set It Off" is song by American hip hop artist Juvenile. It was released in July 2001 as the lead single from his 2001 album Project English. The instrumental's inspiration was "Drag 'Em 'N tha River" off of Uptown 4 Life by U.N.L.V. in 1996, sung by Yellaboy, who was deceased a year later.

Track listing
"Set It Off (Radio Edit)"
"Set It Off (LP Version)"
"Set It Off (Instrumental)"
"Set It Off (Acapella)"
"Set It Off (TV track)"

Charts

Weekly charts

Year-end charts

References

2001 songs
2001 singles
Cash Money Records singles
Juvenile (rapper) songs
Mannie Fresh songs
Dirty rap songs
Songs written by Juvenile (rapper)
Songs written by Mannie Fresh